Tango argentino (en:Argentine tango) is an Argentinian documentary written and directed by Simón Feldman, which was produced in 1969 and shown at a few international film festivals to overall positive reviews. The film includes mounted animation scenes of tango dancers, which was overseen by Francisco García Jiménez.

Synopsis 
Tango argentino views life in Buenos Aires and the history of the city's native music and dances.

Cast 
 Astor Piazzolla
 Antonio Agri
 Oscar López Ruiz
 Kicho Díaz
 Lita and Jorge
 Quinteto Guardia Vieja
 Conjunto Negro Can de Montevideo
 Oscar Aráiz
 Juan Carlos Cedrón
 Ana Itelman
 Carmencita Calderón
 Bárbara Huguets
 Eduardo Avakian
 Chyoko
 Aníbal Troilo

References

External links 
 Information about Tango argentino on the national film website (Spanish)
 

French documentary films
Argentine documentary films
Argentine tango
1969 films
1969 documentary films
1960s French films
1960s Argentine films